United Nations Security Council Resolution 72, adopted on August 11, 1949, after receiving a report by the Acting United Nations Mediator in Palestine on the completion of his responsibilities the UN decided to pay tribute to the late Count Folke Bernadotte, the then current Acting Mediator Dr. Ralph J. Bunche and the Belgian, French, Swedish and American officers who served on the staff and as military observers in Palestine.

No vote was taken as the resolution was adopted.

See also
 Arab–Israeli conflict
 United Nations Security Council Resolution 73
 List of United Nations Security Council Resolutions 1 to 100 (1946–1953)

References
Text of the Resolution at undocs.org

External links
 

 0072
 0072
August 1949 events